Ambalandingana is a small village in the Amoron'i Mania region of Madagascar, Africa.

References

External links
 

Populated places in Amoron'i Mania